The Sutlej Medal was a campaign medal approved in 1846, for issue to officers and men of the British Army and Honourable East India Company who served in the Sutlej campaign of 1845–46 (also known as the First Anglo-Sikh War). This medal was the first to use clasps to denote soldiers who fought in the major battles of the campaign.

The medal was approved on 17 April 1846.

Description  
 A circular silver medal,  in diameter, designed by William Wyon.
 Obverse: The diademed head of Queen Victoria with the legend VICTORIA REGINA. 
 Reverse: A standing figure of victory, facing left and holding a wreath in her outstretched hand, with a collection of trophies at her feet. Around the circumference is the legend ARMY OF THE SUTLEJ, with the name and year of the first battle in which the recipient served below.
 The recipient's name and unit are impressed on the rim of the medal in capital letters or roman skeleton lettering.

Clasps
The Sutlej Medal commemorates four battles. The first in which the recipient participated is shown on the reverse of the medal, with any further battles indicated by a clasp. As there was no battle prior to the battle of Moodkee no clasp was produced for this action.The three clasps awarded were for the battles of:
 Ferozeshuhur
 Aliwal
 Sobraon

References

Bibliography
 Mackay, J and Mussel, J (eds) - Medals Yearbook - 2005, (2004), Token Publishing.
 Joslin, Litherland, and Simpkin (eds), British Battles and Medals, (1988), Spink

 
British campaign medals
Medals of the Honourable East India Company
Anglo-Sikh wars